Shot Caller or Shotcaller may refer to:

Shot Caller (film), a 2017 film
"Shot Caller" (Ian Carey song), a 2009 song by Ian Carey
"Shot Caller" (song), a 2012 song by French Montana
"Shotcaller", a 2011 song by Taio Cruz from TY.O